"Wall to Wall" is a song recorded by American singer Chris Brown for his second studio album, Exclusive (2007). The song was produced by Sean Garrett and Walter Scott. Selected as the album's lead single, "Wall to Wall" was first released to urban rhythmic radios on May 29, 2007. It received critical praise from contemporary music critics; many of them called the song a potential hit single and one of the album's best tracks. Even though the song failed to attain chart success on the Billboard Hot 100, peaking at number 79, it did manage to appear on the 2007 compilation album Now That's What I Call Music! 26. It also peaked inside the top thirty in Australia and New Zealand while peaking in the lower end of the charts in European countries. The music video for "Wall to Wall" was inspired by Michael Jackson's "Thriller" and the 1998 film Blade. The remix of the song features American rapper Jadakiss, who also appears in the music video. It was his first single to chart at a very low position in the UK and US.

Background and composition
"Wall to Wall" was written by Brown, Sean Garrett and Walter Scott, and produced by Sean Garrett and Walter Scott; the latter, however, is credited as the co-producer. Carlton Lynn recorded it at Silent Sound Studios - a recording studio in Atlanta, Georgia. The song was mixed at Chung King Studios in New York City, New York by Brian Stanley with assistance from Anthony Palazzole. The song was finally mastered by Chris Athens at Sterling Sound in New York City, New York. "Wall to Wall" was released as the lead single from Brown's second studio album Exclusive (2007). On May 29, 2007, Jive Records and Zomba Recordings serviced the song to urban radios in the United States. "Wall to Wall" is in the key of G minor with an uptempo vibe. It combines elements of dance music with a bouncing rhythm. The lyrics are based on an attraction to women.

Music video
The music video for "Wall to Wall" is an imitation of the 1998 film Blade, but tributes Michael Jackson's Thriller. The video was released to AOL Music on May 21, 2007, filmed at the Jewish community center, Brandeis-Bardin Institute, made famous for being the Command Center/Power Chamber on Mighty Morphin' Power Rangers to Power Rangers Turbo. Brown and Erik White directed the video.

Synopsis
It begins with Brown and two friends walking towards his car. As his friends leave, he hears a female voice calling his name. He then gets inside his car, only to see in the other seat a female grab him by the head and bite him with her fangs. He wakes up sometime later dressed all black clothing and wearing fangs, indicating he has been turned into a vampire. Brown drives to a remote building, while the sound of the female's voice grows stronger. He gets out of the car and as the song begins, he takes off his vampire trench coat which leads to the dance sequences with two young dancers. They then enter the building with flashlights, which is filled with women reaching out to Brown. He then sees the female vampire that bit him and he notices three women doing acrobatics on the wall. After performing a dance sequence on a wall with two other dancers, Brown escapes. The female vampire sees him escape, she makes a run, takes off her vampire trench coat and tries to surround him while many women enter the room and surround him as he begins to levitate in the light. During this levitation, the moon moves away from and in front of the sun, causing Brown to transform back to a human and then to a vampire again. It then enters a dance sequence with the female and male dancers, which lasts up until the last twenty seconds of the video. Sean Garrett, one of the song's writers, makes a cameo appearance. After the dance sequence ends, Brown transports back to the scene where the female vampire appears in his car and bites him.

Critical reception
Andy Kellman of Allmusic named "Wall to Wall" one of the album's highlights. Allison Stewart of The Washington Post called the song a "thumping, hook-happy beaut" and wrote that "it has just the right mix of familiarity and invention." DJ Z of DJ Booth called the song an "infectious dance number that should have ladies running towards the floor." Nathan S., a writer for the same publication, praised [the producers] production and called it a "perfectly enjoyable R&B/pop track", but commented "it's no "Kiss Kiss"." Patrick Robinson of 411 Mania praised the song as a "decent club jam" despite its low chart standings and said it had the same energy as "Run It!". Trent Fitzgerald of PopCrush listed "Wall to Wall" as the ninth best song released by Brown, writing that "it showed that Brown was a major force to be reckon with in the R&B game."

Chart performance
Wall to Wall debuted on the chart at number 96 Billboard Hot 100, in the issue dated June 16, 2007. Two weeks later, in the issue dated June 30, 2007, it peaked at number 79 on the chart, becoming his least successful single at the time. "Wall to Wall" spent a total of nine weeks on the Billboard Hot 100. The song also chart on the US R&B/Hip-Hop Songs chart, peaking at number 22. On November 22, 2017, the single was certified platinum by the Recording Industry Association of America (RIAA) for sales of over a million copies in the United States.

In other countries, the single charted better on the New Zealand Top 40, debuting and peaking at number fifteen in the issue dated August 13, 2007. In the United Kingdom, the song debuted at number 75 in the issue dated September 1, 2007, where it spent another week at number 85 before falling off the chart. "Wall to Wall" debuted and peaked at number 21 on the Australian Singles Chart in the issue dated September 23, 2007. It spent a total of ten weeks on the chart. In Switzerland, the song spent only four weeks on the singles chart, peaking at number 87 in its last week.

Credits
Recording, mixing and mastering
 Recorded at Silent Sound Studios in Atlanta, Georgia
 Mixed at Chung King Studios in New York City, New York
 Mastered at Sterling Sound in New York City, New York

Personnel
 Vocals - Chris Brown
 Songwriting - Sean Garrett, Walter Scott
 Production - Sean Garrett, Great Scott
 Recording - Carlton Lynn
 Mixing - Brian Stanley, assisted by Anthony Palazzole
 Mastering - Chris Athens
Credits adapted from Exclusive liner notes, Jive Records, Zomba Recording.

Track listing

Digital single
"Wall to Wall" - 3:48

Two-track single
"Wall to Wall" - 3:48
"Wall to Wall JORDAN RUSSLE (Instrumental)" - 3:48

Five-track EP
"Wall to Wall (Main Version)" - 3:48
"Wall to Wall (Mike D Remix)" - 3:43
"Wall to Wall (Remix) (featuring Jadakiss)" - 4:30
"Wall to Wall (B&B Remix)" - 3:10
"Wall to Wall (Ashanti Boyz Remix)" - 3:04

CD Single
"Wall to Wall" - 3:48
"Wall to Wall (Instrumental)" - 3:48
"Wall to Wall (Remix) (featuring Jadakiss)" - 4:30
"Wall to Wall (Mike D Remix)" - 3:43
"Wall to Wall (Video)" - 5:21

Four-track EP
"Wall to Wall" - 3:48
"Wall to Wall (Instrumental)" - 3:48
"Wall to Wall (Remix) (featuring Jadakiss)" - 4:30
"Wall to Wall (Mike D Remix)" - 3:43

Charts

Weekly charts

Year-end charts

Certifications

Radio and release history

References

2007 singles
Chris Brown songs
Songs written by Sean Garrett
Music videos directed by Erik White
2007 songs
Jive Records singles
Vampires in music